Dally Messenger III (born 1938) is a civil celebrant, author, publisher, commentator, and a founder and chronicler of the civil celebrant movement which originated in Australia. He is the grandson of the rugby union and rugby league footballer Dally Messenger, aka Herbert Henry "Dally" Messenger, whose nickname "Dally" has become his grandson's given name.

Antecedents and family background 
Dally Messenger III (Dally Raymond Messenger) shares with his grandfather, q rugby player, some ancestors who were notable rowers and boat-builders. Dally Messenger III is the great-great-grandson of Thames boat-builder James Arthur Messenger, who was a Queen's Waterman, barge master to Queen Victoria, and sculling champion of the world from 1854 to 1857.

He is also the great grandson of Charles Amos Messenger, the sculling champion of Victoria, 1881 Rowing Champion of New Zealand, and 1887 contender for the sculling championship of the world. Charles Amos also established the first boatshed on Sydney Harbour at Balmain, from where it was later transferred (by flotation) to Double Bay.

Biographical summary 
According to a 1972 feature article on him in Woman's Day magazine, and an article in 2011 in the Docklands News (Melbourne), which are on his own personal website and information provided in the semi-autobiographical book, Murphy's Law and the Pursuit of Happiness: A History of the Civil Celebrant Movement, Dally Messenger III was born in Sydney in February 1938, the son of Dally Messenger Junior and Dorothy née Davidson. He was raised in Sydney, but spent most of his school years in Katoomba in the Blue Mountains where he attended St Bernard's College.

Thereafter he returned to Sydney and spent his last year of secondary schooling at Marist Brothers, Parramatta, then worked for several years in banking and wholesale before entering a seminary to study for the Catholic priesthood at St Columba's College, Springwood, NSW (and later St Patricks's College, Manly).

Reform and change in the Catholic Church
The historian Christopher Geraghty relates that Messenger had a reputation in the seminary for diplomatically challenging authority.

Messenger gained his degree (Sacrae Theologiae Baccalaureus (STB)) in 1964, teaching qualifications in 1965, and was ordained a priest in 1966.

Historians Michael Parer and Tony Peterson record that Messenger was an activist and significant analyst of the changes in this post Vatican II time of turmoil in the Catholic Church.  Parer and Peterson also describe Messenger's disillusionment with the conservatism of church leaders and with the lack of Christian values, such as compassion, kindness, respect and tolerance, in the seminary, and in the organisational structure of the church.  He was dispirited by what he perceived as errors in church teaching and practice, such as the role of church authority and the prohibition on all methods of birth control. He could not understand the resistance to what he considered to be the Vatican Council's clearly agreed reforms. He took a strong stand in rejecting celibacy of the clergy as contrary to the church's own teachings on human rights. Messenger left the priesthood after only a year.

Referring to Messenger and others, church historian Edmund Campion records the "great wastage of talent" which occurred at this time in the Catholic Church.

The New Earth Credit Union
Campion further describes how Messenger set up the New Earth Credit Union to assist former clergy with low interest loans. At the time loans to former clergy were generally unavailable because they usually had no assets and no credit record. Severance payments and superannuation were unheard of.

After leaving the priesthood Messenger moved to Melbourne, where he taught at the Presbyterian Haileybury College for six years (1969-1975). During this period he married and became the father of three daughters. In 1976 he gained a post-graduate diploma in Librarianship (teacher-librarian) from Melbourne State College (now part of Melbourne University).

Dance Australia Magazine

Messenger was also the founding editor and publisher of Dance Australia Magazine, which he, with others, established in 1980. Collaborators included Brian McInerney, Marjorie Messenger (children's editor), Dennis Ogden (design artist), Jean Nugent (office management), Russell Naughton (photography), June Joubert (illustrator), Robyn Summers (public relations), Ted Pask (history features), Patricia Laughlin (reviewer and writer), Dawn Dickson (office management) and Campbell Smith (relief editor, art and design). Other early contributors were the writers, Blazenka Brysha and André L'Estrange, and the photographer, Jeff Busby)

His work on creating this magazine was recognised by two national arts awards. The first was an award for "Services to Dance" in the inaugural National Dance Awards, presented at the Sydney Opera House in May 1997. The website citation reads as follows:
Dally had the vision and determination to publish the first dance magazine in Australia. In 1980 he began producing Dance Australia, which is still providing quality news, advice, reviews and advertising for the dance industry.

Tributes to Messenger's achievement were subsequently published in Dance Australia by Keith Bain, Noel Pelly, Vicki Fairfax, Alan Brissenden and Pamela Ruskin. Vicki Fairfax wrote in this edition,
What a debt we owe him and what an enormous hole there would be in our history were it not for the magazine he set up, against all the odds.

The second award was an Australian Dance Award for "Outstanding Achievement in Dance Education" awarded in 2008 and presented on 15 June at the Arts Centre in Melbourne.
Editor Messenger records the early struggles to establish Dance Australia in the article "A Pioneer's Reminiscence" he wrote for the 25th anniversary edition.
Said Messenger:
I left Dance Australia with some huge satisfactions, which made those ten years worth while. We had chronicled, with love and dedication, a great period of development in Australian Dance. I know that by doing so we boosted, not only the art form itself, but the life of the performing arts in Australia. I speak on behalf of my originally pioneering team, when I boast that we produced successfully the first truly independent performing arts magazine in Australian history.

Dance Australia is currently published (2014) by Yaffa Publishing of Sydney which purchased the magazine c. 1990.

Pioneer of civil celebrancy
Dally Messenger III is most noted for his long involvement in the civil celebrant program, first in Australia and then in other English-speaking countries. In the 1960s Messenger was the first person ever to apply to become a Civil Marriage Celebrant under the provisions of the new Commonwealth Marriage Act of Australia (1961).

In the 1970s he was one of a group of marriage-reformers who helped persuade the reforming Attorney-General Lionel Murphy to introduce civil marriage celebrants in Australia. Murphy's reforms have since served as a model to other English-speaking countries, though in none of them has civil celebrancy, to date, become as firmly established as in Australia. In Australia by 2015, 74.9% of couples chose civil celebrants. The use of registry office marriages in some states has also been greatly reduced or has disappeared altogether, as in the Australian Capital Territory.

Ray Dahlitz, author of the Secular Who's Who, describes Messenger as a humanist, educationalist, and defender of cultural rights, and records that he was appointed first secretary of the Association of Civil Marriage Celebrants of Australia (ACMCA).

A great number of sources are available during his forty years of involvement to describe his celebrancy career, his public statements and his ideals. He was appointed a Civil Marriage Celebrant by Attorney-General Lionel Murphy in 1974. They both shared a revulsion at the way secular people were humiliated at the Registry Office civil marriage "ceremony".  At Murphy's suggestion, Messenger became committed to near full-time work as a celebrant. In this profession he sought to progress Murphy's vision.

Campion describes how Messenger became national media spokesperson for the main body of civil celebrants. He is variously described as the "Don of Celebrancy", the "Doyen of Celebrancy", "Pioneer Celebrant" and similar.

Civil funeral celebrants
He was the inaugural president of the original Funeral Celebrants Association of Australia. See also Origin of civil celebrancy in Australia. He was a founder, and is now a life member of the Australian Federation of Civil Celebrants Inc. The citation for life membership acknowledges Messenger as one who "has passionately advocated freedom of choice, standards of service, proper selection and training, and artistic content of ceremonies in response to community need", and as "the founder and inaugural President of the original Funeral Celebrants Association of Australia which established a unique professionalism in non-religious and personally prepared funeral ceremonies."

Messenger's concern for personalized civil funerals led him into a long conflict with Australian funeral directors. Funeral directors often arrange a celebrant for their clients, but may propose low or very low fees either because they regard the celebrant's contribution as unimportant or because they see fees paid to celebrants as being in competition with the fees they might command for their own role in the funeral ceremony. Messenger argued that this was a conflict of interest, and that funeral directors must allow celebrants to receive fees that would enable them to perform to a proper professional standard. In particular, he believed the celebrant's role must include creating, or overseeing the creation of, a well-researched "eulogy" which should involve an appropriate yet reasonably candid account of the main events, concerns, and achievements, of the deceased person's life. This account should reflect, and where necessary should combine and reconcile, the memories of a number of the deceased's close relatives or friends. Messenger saw this as skilled and patient work, and the eulogy as "without question ... the most important part of the ceremony."

The ACCC and the fees for funerals
However his attempts to persuade celebrants to refuse inadequate fees were brought to the attention of the Australian Consumer and Competition Commission (ACCC). It prosecuted him for breaching Victorian consumer law by attempting to fix the fees which civil celebrants charged for providing funeral services. Messenger claimed that he was not attempting to fix fees, but to bluff the funeral directors into increasing the fixed fee which they had set by collaboration among themselves for many years. Messenger also complained that it was impossible for him as a private citizen and old age pensioner to afford the legal costs required to contest the ACCC's arguments in this complex area of the law. 

In 2007, Dally Messenger and the ACCC reached a plea bargain whereby he pleaded guilty to attempting to induce persons to contravene section 45(2)(a)(ii) of the Competition Code of Victoria, and was penalised $46,000 plus his own legal costs of $20,000. This verdict led to protests by several prominent people  who claimed the ACCC had sided with the exploiters rather than the customers. Messenger and his supporters continue to argue that the public in Australia is ill-served by a system that allows funeral directors so much control over the conditions and remuneration of celebrants.

Same sex marriages
Messenger was also an early and long-term supporter of same-sex marriages, which were finally legalised in Australia in December 2017. By 1979, he offered commitment ceremonies for same-sex couples; and also trained graduates of his ICC to use in their  Monitum the words "Marriage, as most of us understand it in Australia, is the union of two persons", until in 2003 the Attorney-General's Department banned the use of "as most of us understand it" and insisted (until 2018) on "the union of a man and a woman".

Honours
Messenger was made a life member of the Celebrants and Celebrations Network (CCN) on 8 May 2014 in recognition of his services to celebrants. The citation with this life membership calls Messenger "The Don of Celebrancy" and refers to "his unique contribution to the development of civil celebrancy in the Western World."

Civil celebrancy in New Zealand 
In the 1990s Dally Messenger was active in spreading the civil celebrancy movement to New Zealand and the UK, countries where it was less well established. He was invited to New Zealand as guest keynote speaker at three annual conventions in the 1990s and in 2000. These were in Christchurch, organised by celebrant Frank Crean on 27 June 1998; in Hamilton, organised by celebrant Yvonne Foreman on 23 July 1999 and in Auckland, organised by celebrant Sherryl Wilson on 27 July 2001.

Celebrant Yvonne Werner records that the New Zealand government recommended Dally Messenger's book, Ceremonies for Today, as a basic text for all their celebrants.

Civil celebrancy in the UK
Celebrant Yvonne Werner also records, "During this same period (the late 1990s) Dally followed up an invitation by Roberto Pravisani and Carol Pool who had established a small group of celebrants in England. He gave a number of lectures and teaching sessions in the UK before returning to Australia."

The Scottish author and celebrant Neil Dorward, acknowledges Messenger's contribution to funeral celebrancy in the UK and refers to him as "the father of civil celebrancy".

Civil celebrancy in the US 
In 2000-2002, supported by Gaile and Pat Sarma, Messenger was the key training instructor in establishing civil celebrancy in the US. He gave the launching address to the newly formed Celebrant USA Foundation in New Jersey on 5 June 2002 at the Montclair Library. For two months prior to this, Messenger lived in Montclair, New Jersey, training the first civil celebrants, five of whom, at that stage, had graduated with diplomas from the International College of Celebrancy, including the newly appointed director, Charlotte Eulette.

International College of Celebrancy
In 1995 he established the International College of Celebrancy, and has since been active in endeavouring to achieve "best practice" in civil celebrancy.

In later decades Messenger has often been a critic of bureaucrats in the Australian Attorney-General's department who tried to reduce the training requirements for persons appointed as celebrants, or who wished to train them primarily as marriage-orientated paralegals rather than as skilled in creatively combining the evocative use of language, symbolism, poetry, history, storytelling, music and ritual into powerful ceremony.

Messenger now lives in Melbourne with his wife since 2005, Remi Barclay Messenger (née Barclay, a.k.a. Bosseau).

Books by Dally Messenger III

Ceremonies for Today (1979)
Ceremonies for Today, 1979.

This is a book of model civil celebrant ceremonies, mainly weddings, funerals and namings, together with a collection of quotations and poetry suitable for readings, plus sample vows and other components. It was designed to provide celebrants and their clients with resources from which clients could compose their own personal secular ceremonies.

The book's stated aim was to suggest poetry, music and other artistic components which would lift civil celebrant ceremonies to a level of substance, beauty and meaning that was not generally a part of civil weddings and funerals in the Western world at that time. Messenger sought to help celebrants and their clients find classic poems of quality which could be appreciated by guests when first heard in a ceremony. The book contains poetry and prose from distinguished writers and poets including William Shakespeare, Christopher Marlowe, D.H. Lawrence, Rabindranath Tagore, and Percy Bysse Shelley.

James A. Murray criticised Messenger's ceremonies as "a phenomenon without historical or cultural roots". On the other hand, commentator Dick Gross credits Messenger as recognising the importance of traditional cultural and religious frameworks in composing his "top-selling compendium of civil ceremonies".

Ceremonies and Celebrations (2003)
Ceremonies and Celebrations, 2003.

This is a heavily revised and expanded fifth edition of Ceremonies for Today (1979). This edition expands the range of civil ceremonies to include ceremonies for most of the major milestones of a human life. It is widely acknowledged as the basic text for civil celebrants.

So Mum and Dad have Separated (1981)
So Mum and Dad have Separated, 1981.

This is a book written to assist children of separated parents. It was widely discussed at the time and was recommended to divorcing couples with children by the Family Court of Australia. It was described by reviewers as "easy to read and practical", "positive, reassuring", "in depth and mature" and "very comforting information during the trauma of a parental divorce".

Being a Chum was Fun (1979)
Being a Chum was Fun: The Story of Nicky and Nancy Lee, 1979.

This is a history of pre-war and postwar Melbourne radio and of the famed children's program The Chums of Chatterbox Corner. It chronicles the careers of Kathleen Lindgren (Nancy Lee), Nicky Whitta and Graham Kennedy. Graeme Blundell, who wrote the story of Australian and TV broadcaster Graham Kennedy, refers to Lee and Messenger's book as "priceless".

The Master (1982)
The Master: the Story of H.H. "Dally" Messenger and the Beginning of Australian Rugby League 1982, 1982.

The author claims this was the first published monograph history of the beginnings of rugby league in Australia.

The Master (2007)
The Master: The Life and Times of Dally Messenger, Australia's First Sporting Superstar, 2007.

This book was co-authored with Sean Fagan. It is a revised and re-written version of The Master (1982).

Murphy's Law and the Pursuit of Happiness (2012)
Murphy's Law and the Pursuit of Happiness: A History of the Civil Celebrant Movement, 2007.

As the title implies, this is a semi-autobiographical account of the history of civil celebrancy in Australia since its establishment in 1973 until the turn of the century in 2000. It describes the role of the reform-minded Attorney-General Lionel Murphy who provided the legal framework that inaugurated independent civil celebrancy and helped it progress much faster in Australia than in other English-speaking countries. It praises Murphy for his awareness that the celebrants' grasp of poetry, music, symbolism, storytelling, choreography and ceremony-continuity was more important than legalities.

References

1938 births
20th-century Roman Catholics
Living people
Australian Roman Catholic priests